Esrey is a surname. Notable people with the surname include:

David Reese Esrey (1825–1898), American businessman and banker 
William Esrey (born 1940), American businessman

See also
Espey
Estey (surname)